Choi Ri (born June 29, 1995) is a South Korean actress. She is best known for her role in the historical film Spirits' Homecoming.

Filmography

Film

Television series

Awards and nominations

References

External links
 

1995 births
Living people
21st-century South Korean actresses
South Korean film actresses
South Korean television actresses